The Hakawati ("storyteller" in Arabic) is a novel written by Rabih Alameddine and published by Alfred A. Knopf in 2008. The novel explores Lebanese families and cultures, and was well received by critics.

Plot summary
Set in 2003, a young man travels from Los Angeles, California to his father's death-bed in Beirut, Lebanon.  He and relatives share contemporary stories and parables during the vigil.

Characters
Afreet Jehanam
Baybars
Elie
Farid al-Kharrat
Fatima
Ismail
Lina
Mariella
Osama al-Kharrat
Othman
Uncle Jihad

References 

Alfred A. Knopf books
2008 American novels
American LGBT novels
Lebanese novels
Novels by Rabih Alameddine
Novels set in Lebanon